The Battle of Penang occurred on 28 October 1914, during World War I. It was a naval action in the Strait of Malacca, in which the German cruiser  sank two Allied warships.

Background
At the time, Penang was part of the Straits Settlements, a British Crown colony. Penang is an island off the west coast of Malaya, now the present day Malaysia. It is only a short distance from the mainland. The main town of Penang, George Town, is on a harbor. In the early months of the war, it was heavily used by Allied naval and merchant vessels.

Shortly after the outbreak of the war, the German East Asia Squadron left its  base in Tsingtao, China. The squadron headed east for Germany, but one ship, the light cruiser  under Lt. Commander Karl von Müller was sent on a solitary raiding mission.

Battle

At about 04:30 on 28 October, the Emden appeared off the George Town roads to attack the harbour defenses and any enemy vessels she might find there. Captain von Müller had disguised his ship by rigging a false smoke stack, which made the Emden resemble the British light cruiser . Once he had entered the harbor, however, he ran up the Imperial German naval ensign and revealed his identity to one and all. He then launched a torpedo at the Imperial Russian protected cruiser , following it up with a salvo of shells which riddled the ship. As the Zhemchug struggled to return fire, von Müller launched a second torpedo. It penetrated the Zhemchug'''s forward magazine, causing an explosion that sank the Russian warship. Casualties among the Zhemchugs crew of 250 amounted to 88 dead and 121 wounded.

The old French cruiser  and the French destroyer Fronde by now had opened fire on the Emden, but both were wildly inaccurate and von Müller simply ignored them as he turned to leave the harbour unharmed. While stopping to try to pick up a harbour pilot, he met the French destroyer , returning from a patrol. Caught by surprise, the French ship was quickly sunk by the German cruiser's guns.

Aftermath
The Zhemchug had been tied up in a state of non-readiness while her captain, Cmdr. Baron I. A. Cherkassov, went ashore that night to visit his wife (some accounts say his mistress). The keys for the ship's magazine had been taken ashore and no lookouts had been posted. Cherkassov watched in helpless horror from the Eastern & Oriental Hotel as his ship sank to the bottom of the Straits. He was court-martialled for negligence and was sentenced to 3½ years in prison, reduction in rank, and expulsion from the navy. His deputy, Lt. Kulibin, was sentenced to 1½ years in prison. However, Tsar Nicholas II reduced the sentences, and the two former officers were ordered to serve as ordinary seamen. Both would later distinguish themselves in combat and they were decorated with the Cross of St. George.

Lt. Félix Théroinne, who commanded the Mousquet, was among those killed in the action. Thirty-six survivors out of the destroyer's crew of 80 were rescued by the Emden. Three of the French sailors died from their injuries and were buried at sea with military honours.  Two days after the battle, the Emden stopped the British steamer Newburn and transferred the remaining French prisoners to her. She was then released and conveyed the prisoners to Sabang, Sumatra, then part of the neutral Dutch East Indies.

The Emden continued her successful raiding mission for another 10 days, before she was encountered by the more powerful Royal Australian Navy light cruiser Sydney. The Sydney's heavier and longer range guns enabled her to severely damage the Emden, which had to be run aground and surrendered at the Battle of Cocos.

Legacy

A total of 12 Russian sailors are buried on Jerejak and Penang island. The monument honouring the sailors of Russian cruiser Zhemchug was twice renovated by Soviet sailors in 1972 and 1987 respectively. The battle was mentioned numerous times by Vladimir Putin on his 2003 presidential visit to Malaysia. The Russian embassy in Malaysia holds memorial services twice annually in honour of the fallen sailors.

See also
Bombardment of Madras
Battle of Cocos
Weeratunge Edward Perera

Footnotes

References
Frame, Tom. (2004). No Pleasure Cruise: The Story of the Royal Australian Navy. Sydney: Allen & Unwin  (paper)
Hoehling, A.A. LONELY COMMAND A DOCUMENTARY Thomas Yoseloff, Inc., 1957.
Hoyt, Edwin P. The Last Cruise of the Emden: The Amazing True World War I Story of a German-Light Cruiser and Her Courageous Crew. The Lyons Press, 2001. .
Hohenzollern, Franz Joseph, Prince of EMDEN: MY EXPERIENCES IN S.M.S. EMDEN. New York: G. Howard Watt, 1928.
Lochner, R. K. Last Gentleman-Of-War: Raider Exploits of the Cruiser Emden Annapolis: Naval Institute Press, 1988. .
McClement, Fred. Guns in paradise. Paper Jacks, 1979. .
Mücke, Hellmuth von. The Emden-Ayesha Adventure: German Raiders in the South Seas and Beyond, 1914''. Annapolis: Naval Institute Press, 2000. .

External links
Zhemchug, Emden and Sydney
Discussion of Mousquet history, specifications and crew (mostly in French) 

British Malaya
Penang
Penang
Penang
Penang
Penang
Penang
Penang
1914 in British Malaya
October 1914 events